The Tabera Formation is a geologic formation in Dominican Republic. The shallow marine limestone preserves gastropod and coral fossils dating back to the Late Oligocene period.

See also 
 List of fossiliferous stratigraphic units in the Dominican Republic

References

Further reading 
 T. W. Vaughan, W. Cooke, D. D. Condit, C. P. Ross, W. P. Woodring and F. C. Calkins. 1921. A geological reconnaissance of the Dominican Republic. Geological Survey of the Dominican Republic Memoir 1:1-268

Geologic formations of the Dominican Republic
Paleogene Dominican Republic
Limestone formations
Shallow marine deposits